Cyperus kerstenii is a species of sedge that is native to parts of eastern Africa.

See also 
 List of Cyperus species

References 

kerstenii
Plants described in 1870
Flora of Sudan
Flora of Kenya
Flora of Tanzania
Flora of Uganda
Taxa named by Johann Otto Boeckeler